Robert Sobera (born January 19, 1991 in Wrocław) is a Polish pole vaulter, 2016 European Champion.

Career
He finished sixth in the final at the 2013 European Athletics Indoor Championships and had the same place at the 2014 and 2016 World Indoor Championships.

He has personal bests of 5.80 metres outdoors (2014) and 5.81 metres indoors (2015).

Competition record

References

1991 births
Living people
Polish male pole vaulters
Sportspeople from Wrocław
World Athletics Championships athletes for Poland
European Athletics Championships medalists
Athletes (track and field) at the 2016 Summer Olympics
Olympic athletes of Poland
Universiade medalists in athletics (track and field)
Universiade bronze medalists for Poland
Medalists at the 2015 Summer Universiade
Athletes (track and field) at the 2020 Summer Olympics
20th-century Polish people
21st-century Polish people